"Moral Midgetry" is the eighth episode of the third season of the HBO original series The Wire. The episode was written by Richard Price from a story by David Simon & Richard Price and was directed by Agnieszka Holland. It originally aired on November 14, 2004.

Plot
During a subcommittee hearing, Carcetti expresses concern that the impressive reduction in crime from the Western may be a misrepresentation. He further lays into Burrell about the ongoing problems in the city's witness protection program, ignoring advice from both Gray and D'Agostino. At a dinner with Carcetti and his wife, D'Agostino chastises Carcetti for his short-sightedness in using facts to win arguments instead of an inspiring message, and arranges for Carcetti to get coaching to improve his demeanor.

In Hamsterdam, one of the drug dealers is tricked into going into one of the vacant buildings where he is assaulted, bound, gagged, and robbed. He sees several other dealers have fallen for the same ploy. Once the stick-up crew has left, the dealers manage to escape and alert the police. The dealers plead with Carver, Herc and Colicchio that if they are not allowed to carry weapons, then the police should guard them against stick-ups. Elsewhere, Colvin takes his friend the Deacon on a tour of the improved neighborhood, then brings him into Hamsterdam. Colvin suggests to Carver that he pay the young lookouts to act as auxiliary police and watch for trouble. The Deacon, disgusted by Hamsterdam, cannot be convinced that Colvin's scheme is a good idea. He asks Colvin to provide clean water, needles, condoms and treatment centers now that the addicts have been concentrated into one place. Over drinks, Carver, Herc, Colicchio, and Truck debate the merits of Hamsterdam.

Cutty helps the Deacon load boxes into a car, saying he needs to occupy himself to stay straight. A community leader named Roman meets with both men, suggesting they hold a basketball tournament to keep Hamsterdam's restless boys occupied. When Cutty tells the Deacon he is more experienced as a boxer, Roman suggests an abandoned gym that the kids can use. When Roman presents Cutty with a disused gym, Cutty resolves to fix it up himself, pleased to have something to work on. Colvin leaves a meeting with the Deacon to attend a ComStat briefing, where Rawls insinuates Colvin is altering his reports to get his significantly lowered crime figures and asks Colvin to give him his records for review. After Colvin, Roman, and the Deacon meet with a representative of a public health non-profit, the major institutes initiatives to exchange needles and provide free condoms in Hamsterdam.

Using its serial number, Prez traces Bodie's disposable phone to the store where it was sold. Freamon maps out store locations and finds that they are spread along I-95 between Baltimore and Richmond. He assigns McNulty and Greggs to track the buyer of the phones. Upon visiting the store, the detectives find that the chain’s policy is that security tapes are reused after a week, so there is no chance of getting footage of the buyer. Greggs decides they should drive further out to independent stores. In Dumfries, Virginia, McNulty and Greggs find a mini-mart where Bernard bought eight phones, only to be told they also reuse their security tapes. Realizing the local police could help them, McNulty approaches the local sheriff and feigns racism under the assumption that the white sheriff will be more inclined to help him. However, McNulty learns that the sheriff's deputy, who is also his wife, is black. The sheriff cooperates anyway and promises to provide outdoor security footage of the mini-mart. McNulty and Greggs find a motel and discuss infidelity.

Upon returning to the detail, the detectives find Agent Terrence "Fitz" Fitzhugh installing new equipment, which allows Prez to enlarge the mini-mart footage and get Bernard's plate number. Greggs and Prez track the plate number to a rental agency and find that Bernard rents a car from them every couple of weeks to make his collections. McNulty meets with Brianna and insists that D'Angelo could not have killed himself, and that he was most likely the victim of a planned murder. McNulty guilt trips Brianna concerning her role in the Barksdales and D'Angelo's turn to crime, leaving her crying uncontrollably.

At Rico's funeral, Avon and Slim Charles plot revenge on Marlo. Meanwhile, Bell meets with Senator Davis to question him about the lack of progress in his development business. Back in the office, Avon gives Charles a contact in social services to find some of Omar's relatives. Charles suggests that splitting their efforts between Omar and Marlo may be a mistake, but Avon reassures him that he can handle everything. Shamrock bribes a social services employee and learns the address for Omar's grandmother. Charles has Sapper and Gerard to stake out the house and tells them to wait for Omar to show up. Sapper once more fails to understand the plan. Krawczyk tells Bell about a rival property developer who has garnered much success associating with Davis. When Bell comes back to insist that Davis move faster in making him money, the senator takes him to meet a contact who can arrange federal funding. Bell gives Davis a briefcase full of cash and asks if he is sure the contact can be trusted; Davis calls this a sign that Stringer is still not ready, but takes the money and tells Stringer that everything is a go. Brianna visits the funeral home looking for Avon; Bell tries to dissuade her from talking to him and promises to put them in touch.

Omar

Omar has moved his crew over to the East side and is having much more success robbing the dealers there. On their return to the West side they are surprised at Hamsterdam. Omar believes it is too good to be true and refuses to consider it as a target.

Stanfield Organization

Marlo catches a girl watching him in a club and approaches her. Marlo checks that she is there with friends and declines both drinking and dancing. Instead they leave the club together. After they have sex in his car she persuades him to meet her again the following day. She tells him her name is Devonne.

Marlo phones Devonne to arrange a meeting, but feels suspicious. He assigns Chris Partlow to check out the meeting place to see if it is a setup. Snoop sits in the restaurant where Marlo had arranged to meet Devonne and recognizes Perry, a Barksdale soldier, buying a large quantity of food and taking it to a nearby SUV. Snoop reports in to Partlow. Partlow observes Devonne receiving a signal from the car. In response, he has his driver pull up alongside the SUV, at which point Partlow fires a shotgun through the side window, wounding Avon in the shoulder and killing Tater.

Shamrock reports the shooting to Stringer and tells him that Brianna has been calling looking for Avon. Stringer orders Shamrock to keep Brianna away from him and Avon. Slim Charles takes Avon to a veterinarian to address his injuries. Avon meets with Shamrock, Slim Charles and Perry and tells them they are going to wait out Marlo, forcing him to return to the corners to make money. Stringer interrupts the meeting. He warns Avon about the consequences of war. Avon criticizes Stringer as being too concerned with money and having lost his hard edge for the street and warns he may not be smart enough for the business world. Stringer says that thinking before killing does not make him soft, but Avon challenges Stringer's toughness by asking him who he has killed. Stringer reports Brianna's meeting with McNulty and reveals to Avon that he was behind D'Angelo's death, and that his was a life that had to be taken. Avon attacks Stringer, but Stringer overpowers his wounded friend and tells him that he did it for him, to protect him from D'Angelo turning against him. Stringer lets Avon up from the ground, and Avon walks away and sits down, speechless as the screen fades to black.

Production

Title reference
Colicchio describes Colvin's plan to create drug tolerant zones using the episode title. It's a metaphor for Hamsterdam, being small in morals because the drug dealers and the drug users are protected by the law there.

Epigraph

Davis uses this phrase in his speech to Stringer about the need to prepare himself for moving into the world of federal corruption.

Credits

Starring cast
Although credited, Deirdre Lovejoy, Wendell Pierce, Andre Royo, J. D. Williams, and Corey Parker Robinson do not appear in this episode.

Guest stars
Isiah Whitlock, Jr. as Clay Davis
Chad L. Coleman as Dennis "Cutty" Wise
Jamie Hector as Marlo Stanfield
Brandy Burre as Theresa D'Agostino
Michael Hyatt as Brianna Barksdale
Melvin Williams as The Deacon
Megan Anderson as Jen Carcetti
Clarence Clemons as Roman
Doug Olear as Special Agent Terrence "Fitz" Fitzhugh
Gbenga Akkinagbe as Chris Partlow
Benjamin Busch as Officer Anthony Colicchio
Ryan Sands as Officer Lloyd "Truck" Garrick
Michael Willis as Andy Krawczyk
Richard Burton as Sean "Shamrock" McGinty
Anwan Glover as Slim Charles
Jonathan Orcutt as Sheriff
William Zielinski as Gene - public health academic
Mayo Best as Gerard
Kelli R. Brown as Kimmy
Christopher Mann as Tony Gray
Brandan T. Tate as Sapper
Ernest Waddell as Dante
Perry Blackmon as Perry
Fran Boyd as Needle Exchange Worker
Tiana Harris as Devonne
Genevieve Hudson-Price as Dee-Dee
Felicia Pearson as Snoop

The female needle exchange worker is played by Fran Boyd, who was one of the main subjects of David Simon and Ed Burns' previous HBO miniseries The Corner.

Uncredited appearances
Lee E. Cox as Officer Aaron Castor
Rico Whelchel as Rico
Delaney Williams as Sergeant Jay Landsman (voice only)
Nehal Joshi as Baba Jani manager
Edward Green as Spider
Anthony Fedd as Tucky
Unknown as Tater
Unknown as Veterinary Surgeon
Unknown as Deputy Carol Ann
Daryl Davis as Mondo Mart Manager

Reception
The Futon Critic named it the 15th best episode of 2004, saying "It was the showdown we all knew had to happen as Stringer surprisingly confesses to Avon his ordering the death of his nephew after being chided over his lack of toughness. What follows is absolutely, jaw dropping riveting as Idris Elba and Wood Harris prove themselves to be some of TV's most talented actors."

References

External links
"Moral Midgetry" at HBO.com

The Wire (season 3) episodes
2004 American television episodes